Percy Alliss (8 January 1897 – 31 March 1975) was one of the leading English professional golfers in the 1920s and 1930s, winning many tournaments in Britain and Continental Europe. He was also the father of commentator and former golfer Peter Alliss.

Biography
Alliss was born in Sheffield. He became an assistant professional at the Royal Porthcawl Golf Club in South Wales in 1919, and his first notable professional wins came in September 1920 when he won the Assistant Professionals Tournament and the Welsh Professional Championship in successive weeks.

Alliss was professional at Clyne Golf Club from 1921 to 1923, at Wanstead Golf Club from 1923 to 1925, Wannsee Golf Club, Berlin from 1926 to 1931, Beaconsfield Golf Club from 1932 to 1936 and Temple Newsam Golf Club from 1936 to 1938. He then became the professional at Ferndown Golf Club in Dorset in early 1939, where he stayed until his retirement in 1967.

Alliss finished in the top six at The Open Championship in 1928, 1929, 1931, 1932 and 1936. He played in the Ryder Cup in 1929, 1933, 1935 and 1937. He was not eligible in 1931 as he was employed in Germany at that time and the Ryder Cup rules had changed to require British players to be living in Great Britain. His son Peter was also a professional golfer, golf writer and broadcaster, and played in the Ryder Cup eight times. The Allisses were the first father and son pair to play in the Ryder Cup, and so far Antonio and Ignacio Garrido are the only other.

In 1935, Alliss shot a 262 aggregate on his way to winning the Italian Open. The total established the lowest 72-hole total ever.

Alliss had limited play in North America, but did finished regulation tied for the lead at the 1931 Canadian Open. He ultimately lost an 18-hole playoff to Walter Hagen.

Personal life 
Alliss was the father of golfer and broadcaster Peter Alliss.

Alliss died in Bournemouth at the age of 78.

Tournament wins
this list may be incomplete
1920 Perrier Water Assistant Professionals' Tournament, Welsh Professional Championship
1921 Welsh Open Championship
1923 Essex Professional Championship
1925 Essex Professional Championship
1926 German Open
1927 German Open, Italian Open, German PGA Championship
1928 German Open, German PGA Championship
1929 German Open
1931 Båstad Open Invitation Tournament
1932 Penfold-Porthcawl Tournament
1933 German Open, News of the World Match Play
1935 Italian Open, Scottish Open Championship
1936 Morecambe-Penfold Northern Open Championship
1937 Northern Professional Championship, News of the World Match Play
1938 Penfold Professional Golf League

Results in major championships

Note: Alliss only played in The Open Championship and the U.S. Open.

NT = No tournament
CUT = missed the half-way cut
"T" indicates a tie for a place

Team appearances
Ryder Cup (representing Great Britain): 1929 (winners), 1933 (winners), 1935, 1937
France–Great Britain Professional Match (representing Great Britain): 1929 (winners)
England–Scotland Professional Match (representing England): 1932 (winners), 1933 (winners), 1934 (winners), 1935 (winners), 1936 (winners), 1937 (winners)
England–Ireland Professional Match (representing England): 1932 (winners)
Llandudno International Golf Trophy (representing England): 1938 (captain, winners)

References

English male golfers
Ryder Cup competitors for Europe
Sportspeople from Sheffield
1897 births
1975 deaths